The Z-Morh Tunnel is an under-construction 6.5 km long 2-lane road tunnel between Gagangair and Sonamarg in Ganderbal district of Union Territory of Jammu and Kashmir in India. It is named after the Z-shaped stretch of road that the tunnel will replace. Together with the adjacent Zoji-La Tunnel, this geostrategically important tunnel on the NH1 Srinagar-Leh Highway will provide year-round weather-proof connectivity to Ladakh (Leh, LOC, AGPL and LAC) and Baltal (Amarnath cave), reduce the earlier 3.5 hours travel time to just 15 minutes drive, boost the tourism and economy, and enhance Indian Military logistics. It is one of the 31 road tunnels, 20 in J&K and 11 in Ladakh, being constructed at a combined cost of INR1.4 lakh crore (~US$17.5 billion).

Benefits

The tunnel is being constructed near Gagangir in the Ganderbal District of the Indian Union Territory of Jammu and Kashmir, and has great strategic importance for India as it will provide reliable, year-long access to the disputed borders with Pakistan. Without this tunnel, the road is vulnerable to dangerous snowfall and avalanches, which necessitates its closure for about seven months of the year. However, the Z-Morh Tunnel, along with the Zoji-La Tunnel, located 325km  west towards Leh, will ensure uninterrupted connection between Srinagar and Kargil

The tunnel will increase social and economic development throughout the region and boost tourism in Sonamarg, which boasts attractions including the Thajiwas Glacier and activities such as whitewater rafting on the Sind River.

The completion of the Z-Morh tunnel will also significantly reduce the travel time between Srinagar and Leh, as commuters will no longer need to stay overnight in Kargil to compete the trip—the tunnel will ensure the entire stretch of road is accessible to vehicles throughout the year.

Features
 The Z-Morh tunnel will be a two-lane bi-directional road tunnel between Gagangir and Sonmarg starting at 69.5 km stone and ending at 81.3 km stone on NH 1. 
 The tunnel itself is 6.5 km long and the length of the approach roads between the tunnel portals and NH 1 will be 6.05 km for both ends.
 The tunnel will be 10 m wide with the 7.5 m wide parallel escape tunnel to be used both in an emergency and as the railway tunnel.
 The tunnel is designed for the flow of 1,000 vehicles an hour at an approved maximum speed of 80 km per hour.
 The total capital cost of the project was approved at ₹2,717 crore in the 53rd Meeting of PPPAC held in July 2012. This includes ₹36.48 crore for the cost of land, resettlement, rehabilitation, and other pre-construction activities.
 The tunnel will help keep the highway open the entire year.
There is a ventilation tunnel at Adit between the two portals.
 The tunneling is being built using the NATM tunneling method in view of the fragile Himalayan Geology.

Development and construction agency
Initially, the Z-Morh Tunnel was a 450 million dollar project being executed under PPP (DFBOT - Design, Build, Finance, Operate and Transfer Mode) by Srinagar-Sonamarg Tunnelway Limited, an Infrastructure Leasing & Financial Services (IL&FS) owned company which was also the concessionaire for the project.

Earlier, the project was envisaged to be implemented by the BRO as owner and nodal agency. However, it has now been transferred to the NHIDCL for implementation.

ITNL (IL&FS Group entity) was appointed as EPC contractor, which in turn has appointed Apco - Titan (Joint Venture) as a construction contractor for the project. The work was suspended by the construction contractor in July 2018 due to the financial stress of the concessionaire (IL&FS Group).

The Project Authority (NHIDCL) foreclosed the concession the agreement/contract with Srinagar Sonamarg Tunnelway Limited and reinvented the bidding for the construction of the balance work in June 2019. The revised (Balance Work) Total Project Cost stands at ₹2,378 crore (~USD 340 Million). The work needs to be completed in 42 months from the appointed date.

In August 2019, Apco Infratech emerged as the lowest bidder in the International Bidding Process, and in December 2019, the Project Authority issued a Letter of Award (LOA) for the project.

For the development and construction of this PPP project which is based on an Annuity-based concession (Design, Build, Finance, Operate and Transfer- DBFOT), Apco Infratech has floated a project-specific Special Purpose Vehicle (SPV)- Apco Shri Amarnathji Tunnelway Private Limited (ASATPL).

In January 2019, the Concession Agreement between ASATPL and authority was executed, and 24 June 2020 was declared as the contract (concession) start date.  In July 2020 and it was reported that the project will be completed .

Apco Infratech will be executing all of the EPC (Turnkey) work. M/s Amberg has been appointed as tunnel designer and the approach road design work has been given to Transys.

Status updates

 Oct 2012: Foundation stone laid and  BRO will build this tunnel. 

 Mar 2013: Letter of award for project execution handed over to the contractor.

 May 2015: Construction work started.

 Jul 2018: 22% work completed, but the work stalled by the civil contractor (Apco- Titan JV) due to non-payment of bills and severe financial constraints faced by the developer IL&FS Group.

 Oct 2018: Government supersedes board of IL&FS Group in view of “financial crisis”.

 Mar 2019: IL&FS Group requested authority NHIDCL to foreclose the contract. NHIDCL accepted the request and the process of foreclosure initiated.

 Jun 2019: NHIDCL re-invited bid on DBFOT Annuity Basis for selection of new contractir for the completion of remaining work with 1 August 2019 as the bid submission date. The revised total project cost is estimated (for balance work) at ₹2,378 crore.

 Aug 2019: APCO Infratech wins the contract of ₹2,378 crore and will develop the tunnel (Balance Work) under BOT (annuity) mode. Tunnel will be built in 3.5 years with target completion by December 2023.

 Jul 2020: Work by new contractor APCO Infratech restarted. Both end of the tunnel were through by end of June 2021.

Sep 2021: After inspecting the construction, the Union Minister Nitin Gadkari announced that the tunnel will be partially opened for controlled traffic (for military and emergency services) by November 2021.

 *Sep 2022: The tunnel will be completed and fully opened for traffic by July 2023.

See also
 Lists of tunnels
 India-China Border Roads
 Atal Tunnel under Rohtang Pass
 Chattergala Tunnel
 Dr. Syama Prasad Mookerjee Tunnel between Chenani and Nashri (Patnitop) on NH 44  Jammu-Srinagar Highway 
 Zoji-la Tunnel

References

Road tunnels in Ladakh
Proposed road infrastructure in India
Proposed road tunnels in Asia
Srinagar district
Kargil district